The Mini Hatch, stylised as MINI Hatch (or MINI Hardtop in the U.S.), also sold as Mini Cooper, Mini One, or simply called the (BMW) Mini, are a family of retro-styled two-door supermini hatchback and convertible; and (from 2014) a longer, subcompact 4/5-door hatchback. They were introduced in early 2000 by German automaker BMW under the 'Mini' brand. The second generation was launched in 2006 and the third, adding a longer 4/5-door hatchback, in 2014. A two-door convertible version was added in 2004, followed by its second generation in 2008.

BMW unveiled their Mini hatch concept at the 1997 Frankfurt International Motor Show, when the Mini marque was still part of the Rover Group, owned by BMW. The styling of the concept-car, intended to replace the original Mini, was well received by the public and further developed. The new Mini (Hatch) was launched by BMW in 2001, one year after their sale of the Rover Group in March 2000, and the classic Mini's discontinuation that same year. It was the first model of what has grown to be a prolific Mini range.

BMW's Mini models are produced in Cowley, Oxfordshire, England, at Plant Oxford, and since July 2014, at VDL Nedcar (the former DAF/Volvo plant) in Born, Netherlands. The Mini convertible is, since 2015, only assembled in the Netherlands.

Initial development 

The Mini Hatch (US: Hardtop) was designed by Frank Stephenson, and drew inspiration from the original two-door Mini. Development of the car was conducted between 1995 and 2001 by Rover Group in Gaydon, United Kingdom and BMW in Munich, Germany. During this development phase, there was continual contention between the two design groups, especially concerning the positioning of the car; Rover wanted a straight economy car (which would also replace the Rover 100 Series, which had evolved from the Metro in a 1994 restyle), whilst BMW supported a small, sporting car. Plans for an all-new supermini to replace the Metro in the mid 1990s were shelved when Rover was sold to BMW in January 1994, with the existing Metro model gaining a restyle and a new designation.

The concept was originally unveiled at the 1997 Frankfurt Motor Show at a joint BMW/Rover press conference, with details of the Chrysler/BMW joint venture Tritec engine, and proposed trim levels including Mini Minor (not used) and the Cooper/Cooper S.

Ultimately, BMW prevailed, and in 1999, they assumed control over the entire project following the departure of BMW's CEO, Bernd Pischetsrieder. When BMW sold off Rover in 2000, it retained the Mini project, and moved the planned production site of the car from Rover's Longbridge plant, to BMW's Oxford plant in Cowley, Oxford, England. The team of designers working on the 2001 Mini had finished the full-sized clay mock-up of the Mini in plenty of time for a presentation to the board of directors. However, the American chief designer, Frank Stephenson, realised that the model did not have an exhaust pipe. His short-term solution was to pick up an empty beer can, punch a hole in it, strip off the paint and push it into the clay at the back of the car, which took just a few minutes. The overall design for the mock-up was so good that the board members told him not to change a thing, resulting in the distinctive exhaust tip seen in production cars.

First generation (R50/52/53; 2000)

The first new generation Mini Hatch was introduced in late 2000, being the first model launched under the Mini marque after the original Mini was discontinued in the same year. In some European markets, the Mini One was powered by a  inline-four version of the Tritec engine, but all other petrol powered Minis used the  version. From 2004 through 2008, the soft-top convertible R52 was made.

There are numerous styling and badging differences between the models, including the  having a distinctive scoop cut into the bonnet. The  also has twin exhausts which exit under the centre of the rear valance. The non-S Cooper has more chrome parts than the Mini One and has a single exhaust. The Mini One D has no visible exhaust pipes at all.

Other trim lines of note, sold in varying markets around the world, are the Mini Seven, Mini Park Lane, Mini Check Mate, and Mini Monte Carlo.

The first generation of the new Mini received a facelift in July 2004 for the upcoming 2005 model year. This was also when the new convertible was introduced; it was not available with the pre-facelift design. Aside from minor design changes (mostly up front, and the steering wheel) and improved equipment, the Rover R65 manual gearbox was replaced with a Getrag five-speed for the MINI One and Cooper.

Models
The vehicles produced during the 2001 to 2006 model years included four hatchback models (UK and some international markets: Hatch, US: Hardtop, other markets just plain Mini): the standard "Mini One", the diesel-engined "Mini One/D", the sportier "Mini Cooper" and the supercharged "Mini Cooper S"; in 2005, a convertible roof option was added to the Mk I line-up. In November 2006, BMW released a facelift version of the Mini Hardtop as a 2007 model-year vehicle.

From March 2002, the Mini was exported to Japan and sold at Japanese BMW dealerships as well as Yanase locations. The car complied with Japanese Government dimension regulations and the introduction of the Mini coincided with several vehicles in Japan that exhibited a retro look that Japanese car companies were offering.

The names Cooper and Cooper S are the names used for the sportier version of the classic Mini, which in turn come from the involvement of John Cooper and the Cooper Car Company. The Cooper heritage is further emphasised with the John Cooper Works (JCW) range of tuning options. The John Cooper Works company also created a higher spec model of the Mini Cooper S, the Mini Cooper S Works. It has a higher volume exhaust and air filter, and uprated  brakes and  suspension, and different  wheels from the S models.

A race-prepared version, with rear-wheel drive, called the Mini Cooper S3, competed in the Belcar championship from 2002.

Mini John Cooper Works GP Kit (2006)

The last Mk I variant to be produced using the supercharged Tritec engine was the Mini Cooper S with John Cooper Works GP Kit, a light-weight, quasi-race-prepped John Cooper Works model. Hand-finished by Bertone in Italy, it was offered as a limited-production run of 2000 cars during the 2006 model year, with 444 of those originally intended for the UK market, although ultimately, 459 were sold.

Mechanically, it has a less restrictive intercooler, recalibrated engine management, high-volume injector nozzles, and a freer-flowing exhaust system.

Specifications

The Mk I Mini One, Cooper and Cooper S used some version of the Brazilian-built Tritec engine, co-developed by the US-based Chrysler and BMW; the Mini One D used a Toyota 1ND-TV diesel engine. In August 2006, BMW announced that future engines would be built in Great Britain, making the car essentially British-built again. Final assembly took place at Cowley, Oxford, and the body pressings were made in nearby Swindon at BMW's Swindon Pressings subsidiary.

All models used a transversely-mounted 4-cylinder engine driving the front wheels. All 4 wheels are pushed to the corners of the body to improve handling. The styling of the car, like that of the Volkswagen New Beetle, is a retro design that is deliberately reminiscent of the original Mini. The retro styling retains other classic Mini touches such as contrasting roof colours, optional bonnet stripes, optional rally lights, and black trim around the wheel arches and rocker panels that mimic the wide wheel flares found on many classic Minis.

The Mini One and Mini Cooper were available with a ZF VT1F continuously variable transmission or with a conventional Midlands (Rover R65) 5-speed manual transmission (model years 2002–2004); the latter was replaced with a Getrag 52BG 5-speed unit for the remainder of the Mk I production (2005–2006). The Cooper S came with a 6-speed Getrag G285 manual or an Aisin 6F21WA/TF60SN fully automatic transmission with paddle shifters. The gear ratios of the 6-speed Getrag manual transmission were changed from July 2004 production and onwards.

All Minis had a drive by wire electronic throttle, anti-lock brake electronic brakeforce distribution, and BMW Cornering Brake Control. Stability options were BMW's ASC traction control system and DSC electronic stability control, to improve control and handling in adverse conditions.

The addition of a supercharger to the Mk I Cooper S required that the battery be relocated into the rear of the car leaving no room for a spare tyre, so the S models came with run-flat tyres.

Second generation (R56/57; 2006)

BMW introduced an all-new, second generation of the Hardtop/Hatch Mini model in November 2006, on a re-engineered platform incorporating many stylistic and engineering changes. It uses the Prince engine, the architecture of which is shared with PSA Peugeot Citroën and is designed to be more cost-effective and fuel-efficient, and is manufactured at the BMW Hams Hall engine plant in Warwickshire, Great Britain. The engineering was done in the United Kingdom by BMW Group UK Engineering, in Munich, Germany at BMW Group headquarters, and by other third parties, BMW Group hired Italdesign Giugiaro (IDG) in Turin, to coordinate the engineering, including the development and validation of the body, structure and chassis of the new Mini. Key Production Associates from affected areas in the assembly process at Plant Oxford were seconded to IDG for the duration of the build to ensure a smooth integration of the new model back in Oxford.

Initially launched in the Cooper and Cooper S trim levels; the range was completed in 2007 with the Mk II Mini One. An economical version called the First was added in 2009. From April 2007 a diesel was available badged as the Cooper D, which was supplemented in 2010 by the lower powered One D and in January 2011 with a new 2.0 L diesel badged as the Cooper SD.

The second generation was again offered in Japan at Japanese BMW locations 24 February 2007, and it continued to be in compliance with Japanese Government dimension regulations which supported sales of both the hatchback and the convertible.

The second generation Convertible was unveiled at the Detroit Auto Show and the Geneva Motor Show as a 2009 model-year vehicle (first available for sale on 28 March 2009). The model has a device, marketed as the "Openometer", which records the number of minutes the vehicle has operated with its roof retracted.

Design

Though the Mk II has a familiar look, every panel on the new car was changed from the previous model. Also, the indicators were moved up, integrated in the headlight units. The headlight units are now fixed inside the front quarter panels, rather than being integrated with the previous clamshell bonnet, so that they are no longer raised up with the opening bonnet. This was necessitated by United States law, requiring all essential lighting to henceforth be mounted to fixed, non-movable parts of a vehicle.

The car has a restyled grille and larger rear light clusters. The Cooper S retains the bonnet scoop in order to keep an association with the outgoing model although the relocation of the intercooler to the front of the engine means that the scoop is now purely decorative. In addition, the Cooper S no longer has the battery located under the boot floor, instead being found in the more conventional location under the bonnet. The C-pillars are no longer encased in glass and have been shaped to improve aerodynamics and to reduce the tendency for dirt to accumulate on the back of the car. Much criticised for the lack of rear legroom, Mini added more space for rear passengers by creating sculpted cut-outs in the rear of the front seats. An engine start button replaces the conventional ignition key and, with the optional 'Comfort Access', the car may be unlocked with a button on the door handle when the key is brought close to the car.

Technical specifications
The Cooper and Cooper S models offer a new rear axle and aluminium components to reduce the car's weight; and a Sports kit option comprising harder springs, damper and anti-roll bars is offered with both variants. Another key difference is the introduction of an upgraded electric power steering system, the sharpness of which can be increased by pressing a "Sport" button in front of the gear lever (both auto and manual); additionally, the "Sport" button adjusts the response of the accelerator, and in conjunction with automatic transmission, also allows the engine to rev almost to the redline before changing gear.

In the Cooper model, the W11 Tritec four-cylinder engine was replaced with a  1.6-litre Prince engine incorporating BMW's Valvetronic infinitely variable valve lift, developed on and with Peugeot's core engine. The more powerful  Cooper S replaces the supercharger with a new twin scroll turbocharger N14 DOHC motor in the interests of efficiency, and has gasoline direct injection; consequently, this engine version does not have Valvetronic. This engine also has an "overboost" function which temporarily raises the torque by  under hard acceleration. It achieves similar improvements in fuel economy to the Cooper, returning  combined. Both engines may be mated to either a 6-speed manual or automatic gearbox. The turbocharged engine is the same (although with some French engineering modifications) as the one in the Peugeot 207 GTi/RC.

In 2011 the Peugeot DV6 (Ford DLD-416) engine was replaced with the 1.6 and 2.0 BMW N47 Diesels.

All Mk II models with optional Dynamic Stability Control (DSC) also include "Hill Assist", which prevents the car from rolling backwards on an incline by holding the brakes for 2 seconds after the driver releases the brake pedal, allowing the driver time to engage the accelerator pedal without the vehicle drifting down-hill. Also included with DSC is hydraulic Emergency Brake Assist (EBA) as opposed to the mechanical system on Minis without DSC. DSC became standard on all Minis from September 2008.

The interior of the Mk II echoes the style of the earlier model, but is in fact a complete redesign. The boot of the new car has an additional  of load space. Other changes in design both visible and otherwise have contributed to the Mini's recently awarded five stars in the Euro NCAP tests. One example is the higher front bonnet, which now complies with the European pedestrian collision regulations.

Breakdown statistics reported by the German Automobile Club (ADAC) in May 2010 placed the Mini at the top of the small car class in respect of the low break-down rates achieved for cars aged between 0 and 4 years, narrowly beating the Ford Fusion and Mitsubishi Colt.

Model range

The Mk II range was launched with the One, Cooper and Cooper S derivatives. In July 2009, a new budget version called Mini First was added. Similar to the One, but lower output 1.6 L engine  and no automatic option, it preempted the launch of the One Minimalism by including the Mini Minimalism technologies. The vehicle launched with a base MSRP of £10,950.
In January 2010 the Mini One Minimalism was announced, which was available in two states of tune depending on the market: ( and ).

In spring 2011, a new diesel Mini Cooper SD was launched.

Mini Coupé and Roadster (R58/59; 2011; 2012)

In 2011 and 2012 respectively, the Mini Mk II line-up was expanded with a coupé like the model first shown in 2009, as well as a roadster model. Both are strict two-seater models, which was a first for the Mini brand, derived from the Mini convertible. The roadster's soft-top is either manually or electrically operated, depending on market.

Mini John Cooper Works Challenge (2008–2014)
The Mini John Cooper Works Challenge is a purpose-built race car, based on the R56 Hardtop, and manufactured in the BMW Motorsport factory located in Munich. The Challenge was unveiled in 2007 at the Frankfurt IAA Motor Show.

The BMW Motorsport factory has been responsible for the construction of Formula One and European touring cars for many years. The R56 Challenge has a six-speed manual transmission; 17-inch Borbet wheels with Dunlop control slick racing tyres; John Cooper Works aerodynamic kit including front splitter, rear diffuser, and high-downforce, adjustable rear wing; race-specific AP Racing ABS braking system; KW suspension rebound; height- and camber-adjustable coilover suspension; full roll cage; Recaro bucket seat with six-point safety belt; HANS device; Sparco racing steering wheel; air jack system; and a fully electronic fire extinguishing system.

Acceleration from 0–100 km/h (62 mph) is claimed at 6.1 seconds, and braking time from 100–0 km/h is 3.1 seconds.

The car was used for events such as the Australian Mini Challenge, as well as ADAC events, and championships in Britain, Italy and Switzerland. Robbie Davis won the 2013 Pirelli World Challenge.

Mini John Cooper Works (2009–2014)

Loosely based on the John Cooper Works (JCW) Challenge car, these are essentially Cooper S vehicles with a higher-output engine; a low-back-pressure exhaust system; a stiffer sport suspension; 17-inch light alloy rims with low-profile, performance tyres; Brembo performance brakes; and BMW's dynamic stability control (DSC) and Dynamic Traction control system (DTC) with Electronic Differential Lock Control (EDLC) as standard equipment. All JCW models are only available with a specific Getrag 6-speed manual transmission, and come with distinctive "John Cooper Works" badging in place of the normal "Cooper S" badging. The JCW vehicles are also factory-built, which further distinguishes them from earlier Mk II Cooper S models with any of the available John Cooper Works accessories (engine and suspension upgrades, aerodynamics kit, etc.) that are dealer-installed. All JCW models achieve the same EPA fuel economy ratings as their Cooper S counterparts.

The JCW variants were unveiled in 2008 at the Geneva Auto Show, as 2009 model-year vehicles. Seven cars were entered into the 2011 24 Hours of Nürburgring, coming 4th in class and 34th overall. In 2012, team Partl Motorsport finished in 2nd place in its class with their endurance MINI, finishing in a strong 41st place overall.

The BMW MINI Rallycross Championship, a one-make series, was a support category for the British Rallycross Championship.

Mini John Cooper Works World Championship 50 (2009)
This is a limited-edition (originally planned to be 250 units, then subsequently increased to 500, including 100 units delivered in the UK and 50 in the US) of the John Cooper Works Hardtop. It commemorates the 50th anniversary of the victories by Cooper driver Jack Brabham in the 1959 World Championship of Drivers and by Cooper in the 1959 International Cup for F1 Manufacturers.

The production vehicle was inspired by John Cooper's son, Mike. It includes the John Cooper Works aerodynamics package; John Cooper Works Cross Spoke Challenge light-alloy wheels in Jet Black; specific body paint colours (Connaught Green body with Pepper White roof and bonnet stripes), carbon fibre bonnet scoop, rear diffuser, exterior mirror caps and tailgate handle; and specific interior colour scheme (Carbon Black interior with red knee-rolls, armrests and red stitching on the floor mats, gearshift & handbrake gaiters). The John Cooper signature was provided by "John" Michael Cooper.

The car was unveiled at the 2009 Mini United Festival in Silverstone.

Mini John Cooper Works GP (2012–2014)

The Mini John Cooper Works GP is a limited-edition model run of 2000 units. The GP is a fast road and track focused performance edition, and a celebration before the new Mini variant arrives.

Styling features include specific vinyl stickers on the bonnet, roof, and door panels, GP badging on the boot lid. Interior includes a new gearknob, leather with red stitching, rear upper strut bar (non-structural) and GP badging on the dash.

All 2000 units were produced in the same specification, with the only option from new being an all-weather tyre, rather than the semi-slick tyre developed by Kumho. Left and right hand drives of this model exist.

Special editions

The old tradition of producing special, limited-edition Minis was also continued with the new Mini. For example, the Mini Monte Carlo, recently launched in Singapore, is a tribute to the old Mini Cooper Monte Carlo, itself a limited edition Mini to celebrate Paddy Hopkirk's return to the Monte Carlo Rally 30 years after his original win.

To celebrate the 50th anniversary of the Mini brand, two models were released in 2009: the Mini 50 Mayfair and the Mini 50 Camden.

Also from 2009, thermochromatic, 'chameleon'-called paints were offered in Asia and Europe.

London 2012 Olympic games
At the London 2012 Olympic Games, a set of quarter scale remote-controlled Minis delivered throwing equipment, loaded into the car through the sun roof, to the athletes.

In commemoration of Mini being an official partner of Team GB, an Olympic-themed special limited edition Mini Cooper was released, with a white roof featuring the London 2012 Olympic logo, and the London skyline printed on the dash. There were two other special edition Minis that were released at this time: the Bayswater Special Edition and the Baker Street Special Edition.

Third generation (F55/56/57; 2013)

The third generation Mini was unveiled by BMW in November 2013, with sales starting in the first half of 2014. The new car is 98 mm longer, 44 mm wider, and 7 mm taller than the outgoing model, with a 28 mm longer wheelbase and increases in track width of +42 mm (front) and +34 mm (rear). The increase in size results in a larger interior and a boot volume increase to 211 litres.

Six all-new engines are offered for this Mini, four petrol and two diesels: two models of a 1.2 litre three-cylinder petrol with either 75 PS or 102 PS, a 1.5 litre 3-cylinder petrol with 136 PS, (BMW B38 engine), a 2.0 litre four-cylinder petrol (BMW B48 engine) that produces 192 PS for the Cooper S, and a 1.5 litre 3-cylinder diesel (BMW B37 engine) in two levels of power output: 95 PS and 116 PS (Cooper D), and a 2.0 litre turbo-diesel inline-four (BMW B47 engine) that produces 170 PS (Cooper SD). These engines are mated with a choice of either a 6-speed manual, a 6-speed automatic, or a 6-speed sports automatic gearbox.

MINI has also released an all-new model called the MINI 5-door (known as the 4-door in US, model code F55). It is marketed as a 5-door version of the new third generation Hatch. The base MINI 5-door is  longer and  heavier than the 3-door MINI Hatch models, with similar performance characteristics and greater interior and cargo space.

The 3-door Mini with an automatic transmission will reach  in 7.3 seconds for the 1.5L 3-cylinder petrol model and in 6.4 seconds with the 2.0L 4-cylinder petrol engine.

The Cooper S soon was joined by the higher performing John Cooper Works model in 2015.

In 2018, the Life Cycle Impulse (LCI), the 6-speed Steptronic torque-converter were replaced by a 7-speed dual-clutch transmission in all models but the Cooper SD and JCW, with the latter now fitted with an 8-speed Steptronic auto. These changes allow for improved efficiency and better emissions test results in the WLTP cycle, as well as marginally improved performance.

A battery-electric version, the Mini Electric (aka Cooper SE), was launched in 2020.

In 2022, the second Life Cycle Impulse (LCI) was revealed. The model receives an updated front and rear, and an updated interior.

In 2023, the third Life Cycle Impulse (LCI) is expected to be revealed.

Design
The shape is slightly more rounded than the one it replaces, in order both to improve the car's aerodynamic efficiency and to enhance pedestrian protection in the event of accidents. It has a much longer overhang and higher bonnet. This latest model rides on BMW's all new UKL platform that underpins the new BMW 2 Series Active Tourer.

Criticisms of the design of the F56 MINI Cooper have focused upon the extruded and complex design of the front bumper in Cooper S and JCW variants, as well as the larger front overhang and oversized tail lamps. Further criticism has also centred upon the overstyled nature of the exterior design.

The Mini is also the first in its segment to offer LED headlamps for its main and dipped beams as an option.

With its larger exterior dimensions, the all-new Mini provides more space for its four occupants and luggage, with enhanced shoulder space and larger footwells. Boot volume has been increased by more than 30% to 211 litres. When using only 2 seats in the car, boot capacity increases up to 731 litres.

The dashboard retains its instrument layout, but adds a new instrument binnacle on the steering column for the speedometer, tachometer, and fuel gauge. The central instrument display now houses a four-line TFT display with the option to upgrade to an 8.8 inch screen for navigation and infotainment functions.

Mini John Cooper Works GP (2020)

The third generation of the Mini John Cooper Works GP first appeared as a concept car in the IAA Cars 2017 with a track ready race-track character. The stripped-out interior included a roll cage and only a pair of racing seats (back seats were absent) with five-point racing harnesses. Outside, both front and rear wheels were covered by prominent wings (especially in the rear). A unique rear spoiler and centerlock 19" wheels were other features of the track-focused hot hatch. In June 2019, a tweet was posted showing the Nürburgring time of 07:56:69 molded into the plastic trim of the dashboard.

The actual production model was revealed in November 2019, retaining some characteristics from the concept such as a very similar rear spoiler and wings (this time smaller in the rear). The wider track and wider wheels necessitated the wider wings. Other more extreme racing features (for a street car) like the centerlock wheels and five-point harnesses were removed, although the back seats were kept absent. The suspension is even stiffer and lower than a standard JCW and the turbocharger was redesigned for more boost pressure. The transmission is automatic only because there was no manual transmission available that could withstand the power and torque from the engine. The Nürburgring time on the dashboard was replaced by the individual production number (this same number appears on the front wings).

As of release time, the third generation of the Mini JCW GP is the fastest and most powerful street car Mini has ever produced.

Production was limited to 3,000 units, with a MSRP of $44,900 (USD).

Mini Superleggera Vision Concept 
In 2014 Mini revealed a Mini Superleggera Vision Concept for a possible new roadster, in collaboration with Carrozzeria Touring Superleggera at the Concorso d'Eleganza Villa d'Este.

Gallery

Engines

Fourth generation (2024)
With a summer 2024 launch confirmed, the fourth generation, now called the Cooper, was officially announced and unveiled in camouflage form by Mini in March 2023 alongside the upcoming Aceman and Countryman models.

Sales and rankings
Between 2001 and 2012, 2.5 million Minis have been sold.

The Mini Cooper/Cooper S (2001–2006) won the North American Car of the Year award in 2003. The car won the 2006 car of the year at the "Das Goldene Lenkrad" awards in Germany. MotorPress.ca awarded the F56 MINI JCW with their "Driver's Car Award" and "Top Pick" award giving it a rating of 8.3 out of 10, praising its driving characteristics and engine.
 Fifth Gear awarded the Cooper S their Best Small Car of 2006 award.

The Mini brand enjoyed paradoxically strong sales and customer loyalty in the US, while at the same time being rated worst for problems found in the JD Power survey. In 2009, Mini ranked last, 37 out of 37 brands, in the JD Power Initial Quality Survey, having landed second to last the previous year. The survey gives the same weight to problems from something being broken, and problems due to the car owner finding them difficult to use, unfamiliar, or confusing. The quirky controls found in Minis, such as non-standard windshield wiper or interior lighting switches, were counted both as "problems" that hurt Mini's ranking in the Initial Quality Survey, and also as distinguishing "idiosyncrasies" that, over time, made owners grow to love the cars. This contributed to brand loyalty and relatively strong sales, and expanding the number of US Mini dealerships, in the midst of the 2008 recession and automotive industry crisis of 2008–10.

Consumer Reports ranked Mini as the least reliable car brand in 2013, saying that, "less-expensive European brands are having more problems", perhaps due to cost-cutting at the expense of reliability. In 2015, Consumer Reports awarded the 2006–2012 Mini Cooper S the title Worst Used Car, saying that while it was "cute and delightfully entertaining", the repair frequency was "heartbreaking" because the magazine's surveyed owners reported problems in the areas of "engine major, engine minor, engine cooling, fuel system, body integrity, and body hardware have issues at an alarming rate".

References

Mini (BMW) vehicles
Subcompact cars
Front-wheel-drive vehicles
Hatchbacks
Convertibles
Euro NCAP superminis
Retro-style automobiles
2010s cars
Cars introduced in 2000
VDL Nedcar vehicles